Ashley Reservoir, a Class II hazard reservoir, is the secondary drinking supply for the city of Holyoke, Massachusetts. The reservoir, consisting of Wright Pond and Ashley Pond, has an impound capacity of more than 795 million gallons of water and a safe yield of 2.1 million gallons of water per day.

The reservoir's construction finished and it became fully operational in 1897. Ashley Reservoir is connected to a smaller reservoir McLean Reservoir, named after Holyoke Water Works Commissioner Hugh McLean, through a water-pumping plant that is operated by the Holyoke Water Works. The reservoir has a surrounding gravel road open to civilian recreational use.

Ecology
The reservoir is home to populations of bears, deer, geese, ducks, beavers, and many other animal species. Maple, oak and red and white pine line the uplands, with red osier, alder, buttonbush and other wetlands shrubs closer to the water. Sunfish and milfoil can be seen underwater.

Watershed public access and recreation

In order to protect the water supply from the threats from unrestricted motorized vehicle use, most areas around the reservoir are publicly accessible only by foot, with limited parking available at some of the surrounding gates.

Fishing is not allowed in the reservoir to protect against aquatic invasive species.

Regulations designed to ensure pure water include the prohibiting of Dogs, horseback riding, camping, smoking, sledding and motorcycle riding are among prohibited activities from the reservoir and abutting property. Pedestrians are allowed on the paths and roads around the reservoir but the scenic expanse that contains a drinking water supply limits activities.

References

External links

FEMA 2013 City of Holyoke Flood Map 
Tighe-Carmody Reservoir 
Whiting Street Reservoir 

Reservoirs in Massachusetts
Geography of Holyoke, Massachusetts
1873 establishments in Massachusetts